Francesco Grimaldi may refer to:
Francesco Maria Grimaldi (1618–1663), Italian Jesuit priest, mathematician and physicist
François Grimaldi (died 1309), called il Malizia ("the Cunning"), first ruler of Monaco and son of the Guelf Guglielmo Grimaldi
Francesco Grimaldi (architect) (1543–1613), Theatine priest and architect
 Francesco Ceva Grimaldi (historian) (1806–1864), Italian historian, writer, and administrator
 Francesco Ceva Grimaldi (politician) (1831–1899), Italian politician